Disappearing World is a British documentary television series produced by Granada Television, which produced 49 episodes between 1970 and 1993. The episodes, each an hour long, focus on a specific human community around the world, usually but not always a traditional tribal group.

Series title
The title of the series invokes salvage ethnography, and indeed some of the early episodes treat small societies on the cusp of great changes. However, later the series tried to escape the constraints of the title and already in the 1970s produced several episodes about urban, complex societies. In 1980, Peter Loizos characterized the series title as "something of an albatross"; some filmmakers had suggested alternatives they saw as less problematic, but Granada declined to change it. David Wason, the series producer in the 1990s, observed, "We recognise that the series title can be misleading. Our films more often reflect a changing world than a disappearing one."

Filming of episodes
Each episode was filmed on 16 mm film, on location, usually over the course of about four weeks. They were then edited in the Granada studios in Manchester, usually allowing three months, for the process. Each episode was made in consultation with an anthropologist, working with the producer from the episode's conception, and building off of their personal relationships with the featured community.

In the United States, some of the episodes were re-edited as part of the PBS series "NOVA" (1974), and Odyssey (1980-1981), indeed, they made up a quarter of the first season. Later, episodes from the original Disappearing World ran but received little publicity.

Broadcasts
The series was made available outside of broadcasts early, and proved themselves successful for teaching undergraduate anthropology. Already in 1980, Granada Television had made the series available on videocassettes for educational purposes. Most of the films are held in the Royal Anthropological Institute film library. Much of the series is now available on DVD. The Network imprint issued a 4-DVD set of the first 15 episodes in 2010.

History
In the 1960s, Denis Forman, the chairman of Granada Television, saw an amateur film made in the Amazon and became convinced that well-researched and well-made ethnographic films could have a broad appeal. He sought out its producer, Brian Moser, and had him train professionally at Granada, in exchange for backing for a series of documentaries about indigenous people in South America. The show debuted in 1970 with A Clearing in the Jungle, and Moser remained the series editor until 1977, when, despite its success, the series went on hiatus due to production disputes.

Production resumed in the early 1980s, producing three episodes most years, under a succession of series editors including André Singer, Leslie Woodhead, and David Wason.

Reception
The series received unusually high ratings for a documentary. In 1978, it was voted the best commercial series in that year.

The series was largely well-received by anthropologists. Of its initial run in the 1970s, Gregory A. Finnegan said: "The series has brought an unprecedented wide awareness of anthropological subjects and, arguably, anthropology to the British public." Peter Loizos wrote that the series had had "the most positive influence in the British mass media on public views both of 'primitive people' and of social anthropology." Among anthropologists, it led to a great deal of writing, discussing documentary film style, working conditions, cooperation between filmmakers and anthropologists, and accounts of films; assessments had been both positive and negative.

Upon the broadcast of the series in the United States, John Corry in The New York Times characterized its approach as a "throwback" to "the old days of educational television," with an "austere ethos" that allows viewers to make their own judgments.

After reviewing The Last of the Cuiva, Pia and David Maybury-Lewis, Cultural Survival Inc. and Harvard University said, "We saw the film twice because we had to, but I would recommend that anyone else should do the same for enjoyment, awe, sorrow, and time to contemplate what is going on in the indigenous world, if one can use such a term. The Last of the Cuiva is first and foremost an anthropological film that tries to tell “how it was” and “how it is now.” One hopes against hope that the latter is overdone, but of course, if one reads the newspapers, one knows that the film is right."

Awards
It was nominated for the BAFTA award for Factual Series every year from 1975 to 1978, winning in 1976. It was nominated again in 1991. The episode We Are All Neighbors won an International Emmy Award for Best Documentary at the 21st International Emmy Awards, sharing the honor with Monika and Jonas – The Face of the Informer State.

Episodes
Sources:

At the request of the Mongolian government, the episodes filmed in Mongolia during the 1970s were not distributed under the title Disappearing World'', but should be considered in essence part of the series.

References

External links
 

1970 British television series debuts
1993 British television series endings
1970s British documentary television series
1980s British documentary television series
1990s British documentary television series
ITV documentaries
Television series by ITV Studios
Television shows produced by Granada Television
English-language television shows
Anthropology